Ağdərə (also, Agdere) is a village in the Tovuz Rayon of Azerbaijan.  The village forms part of the municipality of İsakənd.

References 

Populated places in Tovuz District